Phaeolus is a genus of polypore fungi in the family Fomitopsidaceae. The generic name is derived from the Ancient Greek word  meaning "dark" or "obscure".

Species
Phaeolus amazonicus De Jesus & Ryvarden (2010) – Brazil
Phaeolus manihotis R.Heim (1931) – Tanzania
Phaeolus rigidus (Lév.) Pat. (1915)
Phaeolus schweinitzii (Fr.) Pat. (1900) – Europe, Asia, North America, Australia, New Zealand, South Africa
Phaeolus subbulbipes (Henn.) O.Fidalgo & M.Fidalgo (1957)
Phaeolus tabulaeformis (Berk.) Pat. (1900)

References

External links

Fomitopsidaceae
Polyporales genera
Taxa described in 1900